Douwe Durk Breimer (born 24 November 1943 in Oudemirdum, Netherlands) is a Dutch pharmacologist and was both rector magnificus and president of the Executive Board of Leiden University, The Netherlands.

Breimer studied pharmacology at the University of Groningen (1962–1970) and obtained his Ph.D. from the Catholic University of Nijmegen. In 1975, he was appointed professor of pharmacology at Leiden University. His research focusses on pharmacokinetics, pharmacodynamics and drug metabolism. Breimer co-authored over 500 scientific papers and supervised more than 50 Ph.D. students.

Breimer holds honorary doctorates from Ghent University, Uppsala University (1992), Semmelweis University (Budapest), the University of Navarra (Pamplona), Hoshi University (Tokyo), the University of London and the Université de Montréal.

In 1987 he became member of the Royal Netherlands Academy of Arts and Sciences. He was elected a member of Academia Europaea in 1992.

References

External links
 Professor Breimer at Leiden University

1943 births
Living people
Dutch pharmacologists
Academic staff of Leiden University
Members of Academia Europaea
Members of the Royal Netherlands Academy of Arts and Sciences
People from Gaasterlân-Sleat
Radboud University Nijmegen alumni
Rectors of universities in the Netherlands
University of Groningen alumni
Members of the National Academy of Medicine